A serodiscordant relationship, also known as mixed-status, is one where one partner is infected by HIV and the other is not. This contrasts with seroconcordant relationships, in which both partners are of the same HIV status. Serodiscordancy contributes to the spread of HIV/AIDS, particularly in Sub-Saharan nations such as Lesotho.

Serodiscordant couples face numerous issues not faced by seroconcordant couples, including decisions as to what level of sexual activity is comfortable for them, knowing that practicing safer sex reduces but does not eliminate the risk of transmission to the HIV-negative partner. There are also potential psychological issues arising out of taking care of a sick partner, and survivor guilt. Financial strains may also be more accentuated as one partner becomes ill and potentially less able or unable to work.

Research involving serodiscordant couples has offered insights into how the virus is passed and how individuals who are HIV positive may be able to reduce the risk of passing the virus to their partner.

Experts predict that there are thousands of serodiscordant couples in the US who wish to have children, and researchers report a growing stream of calls from these couples wanting reproductive help. The Special Program of Assisted Reproduction was developed in 1996 to help serodiscordant couples conceive safely, however, it is solely designed to help couples where the male partner is infected. WHO 2013 guidelines for starting assisted reproduction technology now consider all serodiscordant couples for treatment.

See also 
 Undetectable = Untransmittable
 HIV testing
 HIV/AIDS
 HIV/AIDS in Lesotho
 Serology
 Serosorting
 Serostatus
 Sperm washing
 Safe Sex

References

HIV/AIDS
Serology
Sexually transmitted diseases and infections
Immunology